, stylised as sakanaction, are a Japanese rock band from Sapporo, Hokkaido. Their music is a fusion of alternative rock, electronic, pop, and new wave styles. The band consists of five members: Ichiro Yamaguchi, Motoharu Iwadera, Ami Kusakari, Emi Okazaki, and Keiichi Ejima.

The name Sakanaction is a portmanteau of "sakana" (Japanese for "fish") and "action". In the band's own words, their name reflects a wish to act quickly and lightly, like fish in the water, without fearing changes in the music scene. Their records consistently reach the top 10 positions on Japan's Oricon charts.

Members
 
 Born in Otaru, Hokkaidō, September 8, 1980
 Vocalist and guitarist 
 Responsible for writing the band's lyrics and music
 
 Born in Sapporo, Hokkaidō, March 11, 1981
 Guitarist
 Nicknamed Mocchi
 
 Born in Tokyo, April 30, 1980
 Bassist and keyboardist
 Nicknamed Neesan
 
 Born in Otaru, Hokkaidō, October 5, 1983
 Keyboardist
 Nicknamed Zakki or Zakioka
 
 Born in Sapporo, Hokkaidō, July 8, 1981
 Drummer
 Nicknamed Ejii

History

Formation
Ichirō Yamaguchi, Sakanaction's frontman, originally started a band called Dutchman, in 1998 with his fellow high school mates, including Motoharu Iwadera. It was an indie rock band that was heavily inspired by British indie bands. From 2000 to 2003, they released one maxi single titled Fly, one album titled demonstration, and a single titled "Mikazuki Sunset" that was only sold at live performances. The band did not gain much recognition. In 2004, the members disbanded, leaving Yamaguchi to continue on alone as Dutchman. Yamaguchi began performing as a DJ at night clubs.

Sakanaction was finally created in 2005. When Yamaguchi was working in a record store, he heard the song "Owari no Kisetsu" by Rei Harakami and it became a great motivation for him to create Sakanaction. Yamaguchi founded the band together with Iwadera. In the spring of 2006, the rest of the members joined. Kusakari had just left another band then and was asked to join Sakanaction, Ejima was introduced by a mutual friend, and Okazaki was Yamaguchi's colleague from the record store.

The name "Sakanaction" was created by Yamaguchi and was met with initial resistance from Iwadera. When Yamaguchi asked him what he thought of the name Sakanaction, Iwadera said he hated it but Yamaguchi forced it.

Rise to popularity
Sakanaction first attracted attention at the 2006 Rising Sun Rock Festival. The band's first physical release was Go to the Future in 2007. Three songs originally from Dutchman were rereleased as Sakanaction releases - Mikazuki Sunset and Inner World were included in Go to the Future while Word was part of a digital download release, and later made it to Night Fishing.

Some time after the release of Night Fishing, the band made a decision to move from Hokkaido to Tokyo where they could reach out to more people. They were also moved from Victor Entertainment's BabeStar label to the main label.

On August 9, 2008, Sakanaction performed as one of the main acts on one of Japan's top music stations, Music On! in the event called Summer Sonic '08. Sakanaction performed alongside Paul Weller, The Fratellis, Death Cab for Cutie, Cajun Dance Party, Band of Horses, Blood Red Shoes, and These New Puritans. The show aired just three days before the New Year, on December 29, 2008.

On December 26, 2008, they made it to #9 on Billboard's Japan Hot 100 list with their single "Sen to Rei" beating out MAYS's "Kiss (Koi ni Ochite... Fuyu)" and coming in just after Greeeen's "Tobira". Over a course of 4 weeks the single moved from #91 to #9. This was a big accomplishment for Sakanaction as they moved forward in the Japanese music industry.

Mainstream success
In December 2008, the band announced their third album, Shin-shiro, which was released in January, 2009. The album includes their debut single, "Sen to Rei", The album debuted at #8 on Oricon weekly charts, the first time they got into the Top 10. The band held a national promotional tour, Sakanaquarium 2009, in February and March 2009.

On January 13, 2010, the band released the single "Aruku Around", which hit #3 on the Oricon weekly charts.  On August 8, 2010 they made appearances at both the Summer Sonic and the World Happiness 2010 rock festivals in Tokyo.

Sakanaction next released on March 16, 2011, a new single titled "Rookie". Almost seven months since their last single "Identity", "Rookie" centered on club music, pop, and rock. It peaked at #6 on the Oricon weekly charts, although sales were affected by the 2011 Tōhoku earthquake and tsunami.

On March 22, the music video for "Aruku Around" picked up awards for Best Rock Video and Best Video of the Year from the 2011 Space Shower Music Video Awards, earning the band more recognition.

On July 20, 2011, Sakanaction released their second single of the year, "Bach no Senritsu o Yoru ni Kiita Sei Desu.". This release helped them to gain even more popularity through Sakanaction's first ever live performance on the popular music variety show, Music Station.

Their fifth album, Documentaly, was released on September 28, 2011, reaching a peak of #2 on the Oricon weekly charts, the highest the band has ever charted. The band also embarked on the Sakanaquarium 2011 DocumentaLy tour beginning October 1. The Makuhari Messe leg of the tour was later documented on a live DVD and Blu-ray released on March 28, 2012.

In February, the band played live overseas for the second time, in Taiwan, together with rock bands Avengers in Sci-Fi and Lite under the same artist management Hip Land Music Corp. On March 20, 2012, Sakanaction took home awards for Best Rock Video and Best Video of the Year at the 2012 Space Shower Music Video Awards for "Bach no Senritsu o Yoru ni Kiita Sei Desu." This was the band's second consecutive year winning the coveted Best Video of the Year award. Starting April, the band also started to host their own regular radio show, Sakana Locks!! on popular radio station Tokyo FM.

Continued national success
Their sixth single, "Boku to Hana", was released on May 30. The title track was used as the theme song of primetime medical drama 37-sai de Isha ni Natta Boku: Kenshui Junjō Monogatari, the first time the band has collaborated with a drama, thus giving them more exposure. Sakanaction continued to garner more attention as vocalist Yamaguchi composed and wrote the song "Moment" for the popular veteran boyband SMAP, who were label mates. The song was used as the theme for 2012 Summer Olympics broadcasts on television channel TBS, and was released in a single on 8 August 2012.

On 29 August 2012, their seventh single "Yoru no Odoriko" was released. The song was used in Mode School commercials as well as a station ID for Space Shower Television. In addition, Sakanaction was allowed to perform again for the second time on Music Station. Their eighth single "Music" was tied up with Fuji TV primetime drama, dinner, with the title track as its theme song, making it the second time the band's music was used for a drama. The single was released on 23 January 2013, for the first time selling at 500 yen, compared to their usual singles being priced at 1000 yen and above.

Again, for the third year running, Sakanaction managed to grab an award at the 2013 Space Shower Music Video Awards. They were awarded Best Artist, with their representative works being the music videos for "Boku to Hana" and "Yoru no Odoriko".

The band released on 13 March 2013 their self-titled sixth album, which clinched the top spot on Oricon Weekly Charts, their first release to do so. For the album, Sakanaction went on a sold-out nationwide tour starting 30 March. They also included a supplementary tour in Taiwan to play there for 2 days. The band released their first vinyl record, titled Inori EP on 26 June 2013, containing remixes of two songs from the album.

With their sixth album and accompanying tour's success in 2013, they were invited to perform for the first time on NHK's prestigious music show Kōhaku Uta Gassen on 31 December.

Sakanaction went on tour in early 2014. They have also announced the release of a new single, "Goodbye" / "Eureka", for 15 January 2014. "Eureka" is tied-up with the film "Judge!" as its ending theme song.

Singles from their album entitled 834.194 have also found success on Youtube. For example, the single   "Shin Takarajima" has 147,000,000 views, and "Wasurerarenaino", released on June 21, 2019, has enjoyed over 23 million views. In videos, many of the albums' serious topics are offset by vivid and playful situations such as cheerleading, retro celebrity appearances, and people who transform into other objects.

In late 2021, they announced their eighth and ninth studio albums, アダプト (Adapt), and アプライ (Apply). Adapt was released on March 30, 2022. It was preceded by two singles, プラトー (Plateau), and ショック! (Shock!).

Discography 

Go to the Future (2007)
Night Fishing (2008)
Shin-shiro (2009)
kikUUiki (2010)
DocumentaLy (2011)
Sakanaction (2013)
834.194 (2019)
Adapt (2022)

Tours

References

External links

 
 Sakanaction @ Victor Entertainment 
 Yamaguchi Ichiro Official Blog "Sakana to Ongaku" 
 Ejima Keiichi Official Blog "Sahanji Antenna" 
 
 

Dance-rock musical groups
Japanese rock music groups
Musical groups established in 2005
Musical groups from Hokkaido
Victor Entertainment artists